Todd Andrew Smith  (born October 7, 1970) is a Canadian politician who has been the Ontario Minister of Energy since June 18, 2021. He has been the member of Provincial Parliament (MPP) for Bay of Quinte since 2018, and previously represented Prince Edward—Hastings from 2011 to 2018.

Smith is a member of the Progressive Conservative party and has held a number of cabinet positions throughout his time in government. Smith previously served as Minister of Government and Consumer Services from June to November 2018; Minister of Economic Development, Job Creation and Trade from November 2018 to June 2019; Ontario Government House Leader from June 2018 to June 2019; and Minister of Children, Community and Social Services from June 2019 to June 2021.

Background
Smith was born and raised in Riverview, New Brunswick. A graduate of Loyalist College, he worked for more than 16 years on the radio with Quinte Broadcasting's CJBQ, Mix 97 and Rock 107, eventually becoming the news director for Quinte Broadcasting.

Politics
Smith ran in the 2011 provincial election as the Progressive Conservative candidate in the riding of Prince Edward—Hastings. He defeated Liberal incumbent Leona Dombrowsky by 3,130 votes. He was re-elected in the 2014 provincial election defeating Liberal candidate Georgina Thompson by 4,107 votes. He was again re-elected in the 2018 provincial election with 48 per cent of the vote, some 8,161 votes ahead of runner up Joanne Belanger of the NDP.

Service in the Official Opposition 
During his time in opposition, Smith introduced several private member's bills. 

In November 2011, he proposed the Local Municipality Democracy Act which would have restored municipal zoning authority over green energy projects in Ontario. The bill was defeated after first reading. Once elected in 2018 the Progressive Conservative Government restored municipal rights to oppose renewable energy projects with the Green Energy Repeal Act, 2018, in line with the intent of Smith’s bill.

In May 2012 he introduced the Electronic Commerce Amendment Act with Liberal MPP Yasir Naqvi. It would have allowed for the use of electronic signatures on real estate transactions. When the legislature was prorogued on October 15, the bill was removed from the order paper along with all other business. It was reintroduced on March 6, 2013, and it passed second reading on March 21 before being adopted by the government as a part of the 2013 budget.

In February 2014, he introduced the Tamil Heritage Month Act in order to proclaim January as Tamil Heritage Month. This bill passed third reading on March 17, 2014 and received Royal Assent on March 25, 2014. The Tamil Heritage Month Act “recognizes the valuable contributions that Tamil Canadians have made to Ontario’s social, economic political and cultural fabric.”

In February 2015, he introduced the Raise a Glass to Ontario Act to reduce restrictions on Ontario craft breweries, wineries and distillers by allowing them to sell each others’ products. This bill won the support of groups including Ontario Craft Brewers and the Wine Council of Ontario, but ultimately was not passed by the Liberal majority government.

While serving as an Opposition MPP in the Ontario Legislature, Smith spent time as his party's critic for the small businesses and red tape reduction, the Pan-Am and Parapan-Am Games, citizenship and immigration, the Hydro One Sale, natural resources and forestry, and energy.

In 2018, Smith briefly considered running to succeed Patrick Brown as leader of the Ontario Progressive Conservative Party. Citing family and financial reasons, he decided not to seek the position.

Minister of Government and Consumer Services 
As the PCs formed the government during the 42nd Parliament of Ontario in 2018, on June 29, 2018 Premier Doug Ford appointed Smith to cabinet as Minister of Government and Consumer Services while serving concurrently as the Government House Leader.

Minister of Economic Development, Job Creation and Trade 
On November 2, 2018 Smith was appointed as Minister of Economic Development, Job Creation and Trade while maintaining his role as Government House Leader.

On February 14, 2019 Smith launched the government’s Driving Prosperity auto plan that set out a 10-year vision for how industry, the research and education sectors and government could work together to strengthen the auto sector’s competitiveness. The plan included action items that focused on creating a competitive business climate, supporting innovation, and creating talent. 

During his tenure as Economic Development, Job Creation and Trade Minister Smith also introduced Bill 66, the Restoring Ontario’s Competitiveness Act in the Legislative Assembly of Ontario. This legislative package included more than 30 actions to reduce the burden on job creators by cutting business costs, harmonizing regulatory requirements with other jurisdictions and reducing barriers to investment. Bill 66 passed third reading on April 2, 2019 and received Royal Assent on April 3, 2019.

Minister of Children, Community and Social Services 
On June 20, 2019 Smith was appointed as Minister of Children, Community and Social Services. 

In response to the COVID-19 pandemic Smith led the development of the COVID-19 Action Plan for Vulnerable People to better protect vulnerable populations in high risk settings including homes serving those with developmental disabilities, shelters for survivors of gender-based violence and human trafficking, children’s residential settings and those residential settings supporting vulnerable indigenous individuals and families both on and off reserve. Smith also played a critical role in other COVID-19 pandemic programs including the rollout of Temporary Pandemic Pay and the Temporary Wage Enhancement which supported more than 47,000 eligible workers in children, community and social services sectors.

On September 16, 2020 Smith introduced Bill 202, the Soldiers' Aid Commission Act. This bill expanded access to financial assistance from the Ontario Soldiers’ Aid Commission to all veterans and their families regardless of where and when they served. Under previous legislation support was limited to those who served in the First and Second World War and the Korean War. Bill 202 was passed at third reading in the Legislative Assembly of Ontario on November 3, 2020 and received Royal Assent on November 12, 2020. 

Smith also began work to renew other programs at the Ministry of Children, Community and Social Services during his tenure. Building on work underway to respond to the impacts of the COVID-19 pandemic on Ontario Works and the Ontario Disability Support Program Smith introduced Ontario’s Vision for Social Assistance Transformation focused on helping more people move towards employment and independence. Smith also introduced a long-term vision for Developmental Services, Journey to Belonging: Choice and Inclusion. This plan outlined the ministry’s vision for how people with developmental disabilities, government and service providers can work together to ensure people are supported to fully participate in their communities and live fulfilling lives.

Minister of Energy 
On June 18, 2021 Smith was appointed as Minister of Energy. Smith is familiar with this file having previously served as the Official Opposition’s energy critic from 2015 to 2018 before the election of the Doug Ford government. 

Since his appointment Smith has overseen programs to respond to the COVID-19 pandemic including the announcement of the Ontario Business Costs Rebate Program which would offset energy costs for businesses impacted by public health measures. Smith has also announced Canada’s first grid-scale small modular reactor, the introduction of a new Green Button standard to provide more transparency for energy users and provided direction to the Independent Electricity System Operator on future procurement of electricity to ensure resource adequacy.

Cabinet positions

Election results

References

External links

1971 births
Living people
Members of the Executive Council of Ontario
People from Hastings County
People from Riverview, New Brunswick
Progressive Conservative Party of Ontario MPPs
21st-century Canadian politicians